Stransky, Stránský or Stranski may refer to
Stransky (surname)
 Stransky's sign, a clinical sign
Stranski Vrh, a settlement in central Slovenia

See also
Stranska Vas (disambiguation)